Percival Kitchener Saunders (9 July 1916 – 2–3 March 1942) was an English professional footballer who played in the Football League for Sunderland and Brentford as an inside forward.

Personal life 
Saunders was a sergeant in the 18th Divisional Workshops, Royal Army Ordnance Corps, during the Second World War. The ship was headed for Bombay when it was torpedoed in the Indian Ocean on the night of 2–3 March 1942. Saunders was killed and his name is listed on the Kranji War Memorial. Saunders was the only former member of the Brentford and Sunderland squads to lose his life during the war. In December 2014, Saunders and other Sunderland players who lost their lives during the two world wars were commemorated with a statue outside the Stadium of Light.

Career statistics

See also
 List of footballers killed during World War II

References

1916 births
Military personnel from Sussex
English footballers
English Football League players
Brentford F.C. players
1942 deaths
People from Newhaven, East Sussex
Association football inside forwards
Newhaven F.C. players
Sunderland A.F.C. players
British Army personnel killed in World War II
Royal Army Ordnance Corps soldiers